The 2008–09 Ukrainian Hockey League season was the 17th season of the Ukrainian Hockey League, the top level of ice hockey in Ukraine. 13 teams participated in the league, and HC Sokil Kyiv won the championship.

Vyscha Liha regular season

Central Division

West Division

East Division

Ukrainian Championship playoffs

First Qualification Round 
 Vorony Sumy - Donbas Donetsk 0:2
 Patriot Vinnytsia - Ekspres Lviv 0:2
 SDYuSShOR-Misto Kharkiv - Prydniprovsk Dnipropetrovsk 1:2

Second Qualification Round 
 Prydniprovsk Dnipropetrovsk - Vatra Ivano-Frankivsk 2:0
 Ekspres Lviv - Donbas Donetsk 0:2

Quarterfinals
 Vatra Ivano-Frankivsk - HK ATEK Kyiv 0:2
 Prydniprovsk Dnipropetrovsk - Bilyi Bars Brovary 0:2
 Sokil Kyiv - HK Kompanion Kyiv 2:0
 Donbas Donetsk - HC Kharkiv 0:2

Semifinals 
 Sokil Kyiv - HK ATEK Kyiv 2:0
 HK Kompanion Kyiv - Bilyi Bars Brovary 1:2

3rd place 
 HC Kharkiv - HK ATEK Kyiv 1:2

Final 
 Sokil Kyiv - Bilyi Bars Brovary 2:0

External links
Season standings
Ukrainian Ice Hockey Federation

UKHL
Ukrainian Hockey Championship seasons
Ukr